Makkah Masjid is the name of various Muslim places of worship.
Makkah means the holy city of Mecca and Masjid means a place of worship, otherwise known as a Mosque.
Institutions with this name include:
Makkah Masjid, Chennai
Makkah Masjid, Hyderabad